Yakov Fuchs (1880–1921) was a Yiddish theater actor. Born in Lemburg (Lviv), Galitsia, he joined a Yiddish theater chorus at the age of 17 and after singing in Lemburg and Rumania for a short time, he became a soloist and then starred in Professor Hurvitz's operetta Jacob and Esau. Yakov's voice deteriorated due to lung disease and he became a character actor. He played both comedies and serious dramas. He died of lung disease in Lemburg.

His wife Ruzha Fuchs was a beloved and successful Yiddish theater star; their son Leo Fuchs was a famous actor.

References

Jewish cabaret performers
Polish cabaret performers
19th-century Polish Jews
Yiddish theatre performers
1880 births
1921 deaths
20th-century comedians
Actors from Lviv